Estola ignobilis is a species of beetle in the family Cerambycidae. It was described by Bates in 1872. It is known from Panama, Mexico, Puerto Rico, and Venezuela.

References

Estola
Beetles described in 1872